Victoria is a state in Australia, with 527 species of bird recorded.

This list is based on the 1996 classification by Sibley and Monroe (though there has been a recent (2008) extensive revision of Australian birds by Christidis and Boles), which has resulted in some lumping and splitting. Their system has been developed over nearly two decades and has strong local support, but deviates in important ways from more generally accepted schemes. Supplemental updates follow The Clements Checklist of Birds of the World, 2022 edition.

The following tags have been used to highlight several categories. The commonly occurring native species do not fall into any of these categories.

 (A) Accidental - a species that rarely or accidentally occurs in Victoria
 (I) Introduced - a species introduced to Victoria as a consequence, direct or indirect, of human actions

Ostriches
Order: StruthioniformesFamily: Struthionidae

This order is not native to Australia, but feral populations of one species have become established.

 Common ostrich, Struthio camelus (I)

Cassowaries and emu
Order: CasuariiformesFamily: Casuariidae

This family of flightless ratite birds is represented by two living species in Australia. Another two species are found in New Guinea. The extinct, geographically-isolated King and Kangaroo Island emus were historically considered to be separate species to mainland emus. However, genetic evidence from 2011 suggests that all three are conspecific.

Emu, Dromaius novaehollandiae

Magpie goose
Order: AnseriformesFamily: Anseranatidae

The family contains a single species, the magpie goose. It was an early and distinctive offshoot of the anseriform family tree, diverging after the screamers and before all other ducks, geese and swans, sometime in the late Cretaceous. The single species is found across Australia.

Magpie goose, Anseranas semipalmata (I)

Ducks, geese, and waterfowl

Order: AnseriformesFamily: Anatidae

The family Anatidae includes the ducks and most duck-like waterfowl, such as geese and swans. These are adapted for an aquatic existence, with webbed feet, bills that are flattened to a greater or lesser extent, and feathers that are excellent at shedding water due to special oils.

 
Plumed whistling-duck, Dendrocygna eytoni 
Wandering whistling-duck, Dendrocygna arcuata (A)
Cape Barren goose, Cereopsis novaehollandiae  
Freckled duck, Stictonetta naevosa 
Mute swan, Cygnus olor 
Black swan, Cygnus atratus
Australian shelduck, Tadorna tadornoides 
Cotton pygmy-goose, Nettapus coromandelianus (A)
Australian wood duck, Chenonetta jubata 
Garganey, Spatula querquedula (A)
Australian shoveler, Spatula rhynchotis
Northern shoveler, Spatula clypeata (A)
Pacific black duck, Anas superciliosa
Mallard, Anas platyrhynchos (I)
Gray teal, Anas gracilis
Chestnut teal, Anas castanea 
Pink-eared duck, Malacorhynchus membranaceus 
Hardhead, Aythya australis 
Tufted duck, Aythya fuligula (A)
Blue-billed duck, Oxyura australis 
Musk duck, Biziura lobata

Megapodes
Order: GalliformesFamily: Megapodiidae

Megapodiidae are represented by various species in the Australasian region. They are commonly referred to as "mound-builders" due to their habit of constructing large mounds to incubate their eggs.

Malleefowl, 	Leipoa ocellata

Guineafowl
Order: GalliformesFamily: Numididae

Numididae are not native to Australia, but feral populations of one species exist in Queensland.

Helmeted guineafowl, Numida meleagris (I)

Pheasants, grouse, and allies
Order: GalliformesFamily: Phasianidae

Phasianidae consists of the pheasants and their allies. These are terrestrial species, variable in size but generally plump, with broad, relatively short wings. Many species are gamebirds or have been domesticated as a food source for humans.

Brown quail, Synoicus ypsilophora
Blue-breasted quail, Synoicus chinensis
Stubble quail, Coturnix pectoralis

Grebes
Order: PodicipediformesFamily: Podicipedidae

Grebes are small to medium-large freshwater diving birds. They have lobed toes and are excellent swimmers and divers. However, they have their feet placed far back on the body, making them quite ungainly on land.

Australasian grebe, Tachybaptus novaehollandiae
Hoary-headed grebe, Poliocephalus poliocephalus
Great crested grebe, Podiceps cristatus

Pigeons and doves
Order: ColumbiformesFamily: Columbidae

Pigeons and doves are stout-bodied birds with short necks and short slender bills with a fleshy cere.

Rock pigeon, Columba livia (I) 
White-headed pigeon, Columba leucomela
Spotted dove, Streptopelia chinensis (I)
Brown cuckoo-dove, Macropygia phasianella (A)
Pacific emerald dove, Chalcophaps longirostris (A)
Common bronzewing, Phaps chalcoptera 
Brush bronzewing, Phaps elegans  
Crested pigeon, Ocyphaps lophotes 
Wonga pigeon, Leucosarcia melanoleuca 
Diamond dove, Geopelia cuneata 
Peaceful dove, Geopelia placida
Bar-shouldered dove, Geopelia humeralis (A)
Superb fruit-dove, Ptilinopus superbus (A)
Rose-crowned fruit-dove, Ptilinopus regina (A)
Topknot pigeon, Lopholaimus antarcticus

Bustards
Order: OtidiformesFamily: Otididae

Bustards are large terrestrial birds mainly associated with dry open country and steppes in the Old World. They are omnivorous and nest on the ground. They walk steadily on strong legs and big toes, pecking for food as they go. They have long broad wings with "fingered" wingtips and striking patterns in flight. Many have interesting mating displays.

Australian bustard, Ardeotis australis

Cuckoos
Order: CuculiformesFamily: Cuculidae

The family Cuculidae includes cuckoos, roadrunners and anis. These birds are of variable size with slender bodies, long tails and strong legs. The Old World cuckoos are brood parasites.

Pacific koel, Eudynamys orientalis (A)
Channel-billed cuckoo, Scythrops novaehollandiae
Horsfield's bronze-cuckoo, Chrysococcyx basalis
Black-eared cuckoo, Chrysococcyx osculans 
Shining bronze-cuckoo, Chrysococcyx lucidus
Pallid cuckoo, Cuculus pallidus
Fan-tailed cuckoo, Cacomantis flabelliformis
Brush cuckoo, Cacomantis variolosus

Frogmouths
Order: CaprimulgiformesFamily: Podargidae

The frogmouths are a distinctive group of small nocturnal birds related to swifts found from India across southern Asia to Australia.

Tawny frogmouth, Podargus strigoides

Nightjars and allies
Order: CaprimulgiformesFamily: Caprimulgidae

Nightjars are medium-sized nocturnal birds that usually nest on the ground. They have long wings, short legs and very short bills. Most have small feet, of little use for walking, and long pointed wings. Their soft plumage is camouflaged to resemble bark or leaves.

Spotted nightjar, Eurostopodus argus
White-throated nightjar, Eurostopodus mystacalis

Owlet-nightjars
Order: CaprimulgiformesFamily: Aegothelidae

The owlet-nightjars are a distinctive group of small nocturnal birds related to swifts found from the Maluku Islands and New Guinea to Australia and New Caledonia.

Australian owlet-nightjar, Aegotheles cristatus

Swifts
Order: CaprimulgiformesFamily: Apodidae

Swifts are small birds which spend the majority of their lives flying. These birds have very short legs and never settle voluntarily on the ground, perching instead only on vertical surfaces. Many swifts have long swept-back wings which resemble a crescent or boomerang.

White-throated needletail, Hirundapus caudacutus
Pacific swift, Apus pacificus

Rails, gallinules, and coots
Order: GruiformesFamily: Rallidae

Rallidae is a large family of small to medium-sized birds which includes the rails, crakes, coots and gallinules. Typically they inhabit dense vegetation in damp environments near lakes, swamps or rivers. In general they are shy and secretive birds, making them difficult to observe. Most species have strong legs and long toes which are well adapted to soft uneven surfaces. They tend to have short, rounded wings and to be weak fliers.

Lewin's rail, Lewinia pectoralis
Buff-banded rail, Gallirallus philippensis
Black-tailed nativehen, Tribonyx ventralis
Australian crake, Porzana fluminea 
Dusky moorhen, Gallinula tenebrosa
Eurasian coot, Fulica atra
Australasian swamphen, Porphyrio melanotus
Baillon's crake, Zapornia pusilla
Spotless crake, Zapornia tabuensis

Cranes
Order: GruiformesFamily: Gruidae

Cranes are large, long-legged and long-necked birds. Unlike the similar-looking but unrelated herons, cranes fly with necks outstretched, not pulled back. Most have elaborate and noisy courting displays or "dances".

Brolga, Antigone rubicunda

Thick-knees
Order: CharadriiformesFamily: Burhinidae

The thick-knees are a group of largely tropical waders in the family Burhinidae. They are found worldwide within the tropical zone, with some species also breeding in temperate Europe and Australia. They are medium to large waders with strong black or yellow-black bills, large yellow eyes and cryptic plumage. Despite being classed as waders, most species have a preference for arid or semi-arid habitats.

Bush thick-knee, Burhinus grallarius 
Beach thick-knee, Esacus magnirostris (A)

Stilts and avocets
Order: CharadriiformesFamily: Recurvirostridae

Recurvirostridae is a family of large wading birds, which includes the avocets and stilts. The avocets have long legs and long up-curved bills. The stilts have extremely long legs and long, thin straight bills.

Pied stilt, Himantopus leucocephalus
Banded stilt, Cladorhynchus leucocephalus 
Red-necked avocet, Recurvirostra novaehollandiae

Oystercatchers
Order: CharadriiformesFamily: Haematopodidae

The oystercatchers are large and noisy plover-like birds, with strong bills used for smashing or prising open molluscs.

Pied oystercatcher, Haematopus longirostris
South Island oystercatcher, Haematopus finschi (A)
Sooty oystercatcher, Haematopus fuliginosus

Plovers and lapwings
Order: CharadriiformesFamily: Charadriidae

The family Charadriidae includes the plovers, dotterels and lapwings. They are small to medium-sized birds with compact bodies, short, thick necks and long, usually pointed, wings. They are found in open country worldwide, mostly in habitats near water.

Black-bellied plover, Pluvialis squatarola
American golden-plover, Pluvialis dominica (A)
Pacific golden-plover, Pluvialis fulva
Banded lapwing, Vanellus tricolor 
Masked lapwing, Vanellus miles
Lesser sand-plover, Charadrius mongolus
Greater sand-plover, Charadrius leschenaultii
Double-banded plover, Charadrius bicinctus
Red-capped plover, Charadrius ruficapillus
Common ringed plover, Charadrius hiaticula (A)
Semipalmated plover, Charadrius semipalmatus (A)
Little ringed plover, Charadrius dubius (A)
Oriental plover, Charadrius veredus (A)
Red-kneed dotterel, Erythrogonys cinctus 
Hooded plover, Thinornis cucullatus 
Black-fronted dotterel, Elseyornis melanops
Inland dotterel, Peltohyas australis

Plains-wanderer
Order: CharadriiformesFamily: Pedionomidae

The plains-wanderer is a quail-like ground bird. They are excellent camouflagers, and will first hide at any disturbance. If they're approached too close, they will run as opposed to flying, which they are very poor at.

Plains-wanderer, Pedionomus torquatus

Painted-snipes
Order: CharadriiformesFamily: Rostratulidae

Painted-snipes are short-legged, long-billed birds similar in shape to the true snipes, but more brightly coloured.

Australian painted-snipe, Rostratula australis

Sandpipers and allies
Order: CharadriiformesFamily: Scolopacidae

Scolopacidae is a large diverse family of small to medium-sized shorebirds including the sandpipers, curlews, godwits, shanks, tattlers, woodcocks, snipes, dowitchers, and phalaropes. The majority of these species eat small invertebrates picked out of the mud or soil. Variation in length of legs and bills enables multiple species to feed in the same habitat, particularly on the coast, without direct competition for food.

Whimbrel, Numenius phaeopus
Little curlew, Numenius minutus (A)
Far Eastern curlew, Numenius madagascariensis
Bar-tailed godwit, Limosa lapponica
Black-tailed godwit, Limosa limosa
Hudsonian godwit, Limosa haemastica (A)
Ruddy turnstone, Arenaria interpres
Great knot, Calidris tenuirostris
Red knot, Calidris canutus
Ruff, Calidris pugnax
Broad-billed sandpiper, Calidris falcinellus
Sharp-tailed sandpiper, Calidris acuminata
Stilt sandpiper, Calidris himantopus (A)
Curlew sandpiper, Calidris ferruginea
Long-toed stint, Calidris subminuta
Red-necked stint, Calidris ruficollis
Sanderling, Calidris alba
Baird's sandpiper, Calidris bairdii (A)
Little stint, Calidris minuta (A)
White-rumped sandpiper, Calidris fuscicollis (A)
Buff-breasted sandpiper, Calidris subruficollis (A)
Pectoral sandpiper, Calidris melanotos
Asian dowitcher, Limnodromus semipalmatus (A)
Short-billed dowitcher, Limnodromus griseus (A)
Long-billed dowitcher, Limnodromus scolopaceus (A)
Latham's snipe, Gallinago hardwickii
Terek sandpiper, Xenus cinereus
Wilson's phalarope, Phalaropus tricolor (A)
Red-necked phalarope, Phalaropus lobatus (A)
Red phalarope, Phalaropus fulicarius (A)
Common sandpiper, Actitis hypoleucos
Gray-tailed tattler, Tringa brevipes
Wandering tattler, Tringa incana
Spotted redshank, Tringa erythropus (A)
Common greenshank, Tringa nebularia
Lesser yellowlegs, Tringa flavipes (A)
Marsh sandpiper, Tringa stagnatilis
Wood sandpiper, Tringa glareola
Common redshank, Tringa totanus (A)

Buttonquail
Order: CharadriiformesFamily: Turnicidae

The buttonquails are small, drab, running birds which resemble the true quails. The female is the brighter of the sexes and initiates courtship. The male incubates the eggs and tends the young.

Red-backed buttonquail, Turnix maculosus (A)
Painted buttonquail, Turnix varius
Red-chested buttonquail, Turnix pyrrhothorax 
Little buttonquail, Turnix velox

Pratincoles and coursers
Order: CharadriiformesFamily: Glareolidae

Glareolidae is a family of wading birds comprising the pratincoles, which have short legs, long pointed wings, and long forked tails, and the coursers, which have long legs, short wings, and long, pointed bills which curve downwards.

Australian pratincole, Stiltia isabella
Oriental pratincole, Glareola maldivarum (A)

Skuas and jaegers
Order: CharadriiformesFamily: Stercorariidae

The family Stercorariidae are, in general, medium to large birds, typically with grey or brown plumage, often with white markings on the wings. They nest on the ground in temperate and arctic regions and are long-distance migrants.

South polar skua, Stercorarius maccormicki (A)
Brown skua, Stercorarius antarcticus
Pomarine jaeger, Stercorarius pomarinus
Parasitic jaeger, Stercorarius parasiticus
Long-tailed jaeger, Stercorarius longicaudus (A)

Gulls, terns, and skimmers
Order: CharadriiformesFamily: Laridae

Laridae is a family of medium to large seabirds, the gulls, terns, and skimmers. Gulls are typically grey or white, often with black markings on the head or wings. They have stout, longish bills and webbed feet. Terns are a group of generally medium to large seabirds typically with grey or white plumage, often with black markings on the head. Most terns hunt fish by diving but some pick insects off the surface of fresh water. Terns are generally long-lived birds, with several species known to live in excess of 30 years. Skimmers are a small family of tropical tern-like birds. They have an elongated lower mandible which they use to feed by flying low over the water surface and skimming the water for small fish.

Sabine's gull, Xema sabini (A)
Silver gull, Chroicocephalus novaehollandiae
Laughing gull, Leucophaeus atricilla (A)
Franklin's gull, Leucophaeus pipixcan (A)
Black-tailed gull, Larus crassirostris (A) 
Pacific gull, Larus pacificus 
Kelp gull, Larus dominicanus 
Brown noddy, Anous stolidus (A)
Black noddy, Anous minutus (A)
Gray noddy, Anous albivitta (A)
Sooty tern, Onychoprion fuscatus (A)
Bridled tern, Onychoprion anaethetus (A)
Little tern, Sternula albifrons
Australian fairy tern, Sternula nereis (A)
Gull-billed tern, Gelochelidon nilotica
Caspian tern, Hydroprogne caspia
Black tern, Chlidonias niger (A)
White-winged tern, Chlidonias leucopterus
Whiskered tern, Chlidonias hybrida
White-fronted tern, Sterna striata
Common tern, Sterna hirundo
Arctic tern, Sterna paradisaea (A)
Antarctic tern, Sterna vittata' (A)
Great crested tern, Thalasseus bergiiTropicbirds
Order: PhaethontiformesFamily: Phaethontidae

Tropicbirds are slender white birds of tropical oceans, with exceptionally long central tail feathers. Their long wings have black markings, as does the head.

White-tailed tropicbird, Phaethon lepturus (A)
Red-tailed tropicbird, Phaethon rubricauda (A)

Penguins
Order: SphenisciformesFamily: Spheniscidae

Penguins are a group of aquatic, flightless birds living almost exclusively in the Southern Hemisphere, especially in Antarctica. Only one species, the little penguin, breeds on the Australian coast.

King penguin, Aptenodytes patagonicus (A)
Adelie penguin, Pygoscelis adeliae (A)
Chinstrap penguin, Pygoscelis antarcticus (A)
Little penguin, Eudyptula minorMagellanic penguin, Spheniscus magellanicus (A)
Fiordland penguin, Eudyptes pachyrhynchus (A)
Erect-crested penguin, Eudyptes sclateri (A)
Macaroni penguin, Eudyptes chrysolophus (A)
Royal penguin, Eudyptes schlegeli (A)
Southern rockhopper penguin, Eudyptes chrysocome (A)
Snares penguin, Eudyptes robustus (A)

Albatrosses
Order: ProcellariiformesFamily: Diomedeidae

The albatrosses are a family of large seabird found across the Southern and North Pacific Oceans. The largest are among the largest flying birds in the world.

Yellow-nosed albatross, Thalassarche chlororhynchosGray-headed albatross, Thalassarche chrysostoma (A)
Buller's albatross, Thalassarche bulleri 
White-capped albatross, Thalassarche cautaSalvin's albatross, Thalassarche salvini (A)
Black-browed albatross, Thalassarche melanophrisSooty albatross, Phoebetria fusca 
Light-mantled albatross, Phoebetria palpebrata (A)
Royal albatross, Diomedea epomophora 
Wandering albatross, Diomedea exulansSouthern storm-petrels
Order: ProcellariiformesFamily: Oceanitidae

The southern storm-petrels are the smallest seabirds, relatives of the petrels, feeding on planktonic crustaceans and small fish picked from the surface, typically while hovering. Their flight is fluttering and sometimes bat-like.

Wilson's storm-petrel, Oceanites oceanicusGray-backed storm-petrel, Garrodia nereis (A)
White-faced storm-petrel, Pelagodroma marinaNew Zealand storm-petrel, Fregetta maoriana (A)
Black-bellied storm-petrel, Fregetta tropica (A)

Northern storm-petrels
Order: ProcellariiformesFamily: Hydrobatidae

Though the members of this family are similar in many respects to the southern storm-petrels, including their general appearance and habits, there are enough genetic differences to warrant their placement in a separate family.

Leach's storm-petrel, Hydrobates leucorhous (A)

Shearwaters and petrels
Order: ProcellariiformesFamily: Procellariidae

The procellariids are the main group of medium-sized "true petrels", characterised by united nostrils with medium nasal septum, and a long outer functional primary flight feather.

Southern giant-petrel, Macronectes giganteus 
Northern giant-petrel, Macronectes halli 
Southern fulmar, Fulmarus glacialoides (A)
Antarctic petrel, Thalassoica antarctica (A)
Cape petrel, Daption capenseKerguelen petrel, Aphrodroma brevirostris (A)
Great-winged petrel, Pterodroma macropteraGray-faced petrel, Pterodroma gouldi 
Providence petrel, Pterodroma solandri (A)
Soft-plumaged petrel, Pterodroma mollis 
Barau's petrel, Pterodroma baraui (A)
White-headed petrel, Pterodroma lessonii 
Mottled petrel, Pterodroma inexpectata (A)
Atlantic petrel, Pterodroma incerta (A) 
Black-winged petrel, Pterodroma nigripennis (A)
Cook's petrel, Pterodroma cookii (A) 
Gould's petrel, Pterodroma leucoptera (A)
Blue petrel, Halobaena caerulea (A)
Fairy prion, Pachyptila turturBroad-billed prion, Pachyptila vittata (A)
Salvin's prion, Pachyptila salviniAntarctic prion, Pachyptila desolata 
Slender-billed prion, Pachyptila belcheri 
Fulmar prion, Pachyptila crassirostris (A)
Bulwer's petrel, Bulweria bulwerii (A) 
Gray petrel, Procellaria cinerea (A)
White-chinned petrel, Procellaria aequinoctialisParkinson's petrel, Procellaria parkinsoni 
Westland petrel, Procellaria westlandica (A)
Streaked shearwater, Calonectris leucomelasFlesh-footed shearwater, Ardenna carneipesGreat shearwater, Ardenna gravis (A)
Wedge-tailed shearwater, Ardenna pacifica (A)
Buller's shearwater, Ardenna bulleri (A)
Sooty shearwater, Ardenna griseaShort-tailed shearwater, Ardenna tenuirostrisHutton's shearwater, Puffinus huttoniFluttering shearwater, Puffinus gaviaLittle shearwater, Puffinus assimilis 
Subantarctic shearwater, Puffinus elegansCommon diving-petrel, Pelecanoides urinatrix 

Storks
Order: CiconiiformesFamily: Ciconiidae

Storks are large, long-legged, long-necked, wading birds with long, stout bills. Storks are mute, but bill-clattering is an important mode of communication at the nest. Their nests can be large and may be reused for many years.

Black-necked stork, Ephippiorhynchus asiaticus (A)

Frigatebirds
Order: SuliformesFamily: Fregatidae

Frigatebirds are large seabirds usually found over tropical oceans. They are large, black, or black-and-white, with long wings and deeply forked tails. The males have coloured inflatable throat pouches. They do not swim or walk and cannot take off from a flat surface. Having the largest wingspan-to-body-weight ratio of any bird, they are essentially aerial, able to stay aloft for more than a week.

Lesser frigatebird, Fregata ariel (A)
Great frigatebird, Fregata minor (A)

Boobies and gannets
Order: SuliformesFamily: Sulidae

The sulids comprise the gannets and boobies. Both groups are medium-large coastal seabirds that plunge-dive for fish.

Brown booby, Sula leucogaster (A)
Red-footed booby, Sula sula 
Cape gannet, Morus capensis (A)
Australasian gannet, Morus serratorAnhingas
Order: SuliformesFamily: Anhingidae

Anhingas or darters are cormorant-like water birds with long necks and long, straight bills. They are fish eaters which often swim with only their neck above the water.

Australasian darter, Anhinga novaehollandiaeCormorants and shags
Order: SuliformesFamily: Phalacrocoracidae

Cormorants are medium-to-large aquatic birds, usually with mainly dark plumage and areas of coloured skin on the face. The bill is long, thin and sharply hooked. Their feet are four-toed and webbed, a distinguishing feature among the order Pelecaniformes.

Little pied cormorant, Microcarbo melanoleucosGreat cormorant, Phalacrocorax carboLittle black cormorant, Phalacrocorax sulcirostrisPied cormorant, Phalacrocorax variusBlack-faced cormorant, Phalacrocorax fuscescens 

Pelicans
Order: PelecaniformesFamily: Pelecanidae

Pelicans are large water birds with distinctive pouches under their bills. Like other birds in the order Pelecaniformes, they have four webbed toes.

Australian pelican, Pelecanus conspicillatusHerons, egrets, and bitterns 
Order: PelecaniformesFamily: Ardeidae

The family Ardeidae contains the bitterns, herons, and egrets. Herons and egrets are medium to large wading birds with long necks and legs. Bitterns tend to be shorter necked and more wary. Members of Ardeidae fly with their necks retracted, unlike other long-necked birds such as storks, ibises, and spoonbills.

Australasian bittern, Botaurus poiciloptilusBlack-backed bittern, Ixobrychus dubiusBlack bittern, Ixobrychus flavicollis (A)
Pacific heron, Ardea pacificaGreat egret, Ardea albaIntermediate egret, Ardea intermediaWhite-faced heron, Egretta novaehollandiaeLittle egret, Egretta garzettaPacific reef-heron, Egretta sacra (A)
Pied heron, Egretta picata (A)
Cattle egret, Bubulcus ibisStriated heron, Butorides striata (A)
Nankeen night-heron, Nycticorax caledonicusIbises and spoonbills
Order: PelecaniformesFamily: Threskiornithidae

Threskiornithidae is a family of large terrestrial and wading birds which includes the ibises and spoonbills. They have long, broad wings with 11 primary and about 20 secondary feathers. They are strong fliers and despite their size and weight, very capable soarers.

Glossy ibis, Plegadis falcinellusAustralian ibis, Threskiornis moluccusStraw-necked ibis, Threskiornis spinicollisRoyal spoonbill, Platalea regiaYellow-billed spoonbill, Platalea flavipesOsprey
Order: AccipitriformesFamily: Pandionidae

The family Pandionidae contains only one species, the osprey. The osprey is a medium-large raptor which is a specialist fish-eater with a worldwide distribution.

Osprey, Pandion haliaetusHawks, eagles, and kites
Order: AccipitriformesFamily: Accipitridae

Accipitridae is a family of birds of prey, which includes hawks, eagles, kites, harriers and Old World vultures. These birds have powerful hooked beaks for tearing flesh from their prey, strong legs, powerful talons and keen eyesight.

Black-shouldered kite, Elanus axillaris 
Letter-winged kite, Elanus scriptus (A)
Black-breasted kite, Hamirostra melanosternon (A)
Square-tailed kite, Lophoictinia isura 
Little eagle, Hieraaetus morphnoidesWedge-tailed eagle, Aquila audaxSwamp harrier, Circus approximansSpotted harrier, Circus assimilisGray goshawk, Accipiter novaehollandiaeBrown goshawk, Accipiter fasciatusCollared sparrowhawk, Accipiter cirrocephalusBlack kite, Milvus migransWhistling kite, Haliastur sphenurusBrahminy kite, Haliastur indus (A)
White-bellied sea-eagle, Haliaeetus leucogasterBarn-owls
Order: StrigiformesFamily: Tytonidae

Barn-owls are medium to large owls with large heads and characteristic heart-shaped faces. They have long strong legs with powerful talons.

Sooty owl, Tyto tenebricosaAustralian masked-owl, Tyto novaehollandiaeAustralasian grass-owl, Tyto longimembris (A)
Barn owl, Tyto albaOwls
Order: StrigiformesFamily: Strigidae

The typical owls are small to large solitary nocturnal birds of prey. They have large forward-facing eyes and ears, a hawk-like beak, and a conspicuous circle of feathers around each eye called a facial disk.

Powerful owl, Ninox strenua 
Barking owl, Ninox connivensSouthern boobook, Ninox boobookMorepork, Ninox novaeseelandiaeKingfishers
Order: CoraciiformesFamily: Alcedinidae

Kingfishers are medium-sized birds with large heads, long pointed bills, short legs, and stubby tails.

Azure kingfisher, Ceyx azureusLaughing kookaburra, Dacelo novaeguineae 
Red-backed kingfisher, Todiramphus pyrrhopygius 
Forest kingfisher, Todiramphus macleayii (A)
Sacred kingfisher, Todiramphus sanctusBee-eaters
Order: CoraciiformesFamily: Meropidae

The bee-eaters are a group of near passerine birds in the family Meropidae. Most species are found in Africa but others occur in southern Europe, Madagascar, Australia, and New Guinea. They are characterised by richly coloured plumage, slender bodies, and usually elongated central tail feathers. All are colourful and have long downturned bills and pointed wings, which give them a swallow-like appearance when seen from afar.

Rainbow bee-eater, Merops ornatusRollers
Order: CoraciiformesFamily: Coraciidae

Rollers resemble crows in size and build, but are more closely related to the kingfishers and bee-eaters. They share the colourful appearance of those groups with blues and browns predominating. The two inner front toes are connected, but the outer toe is not.

Dollarbird, Eurystomus orientalisFalcons and caracaras
Order: FalconiformesFamily: Falconidae

Falconidae is a family of diurnal birds of prey. They differ from hawks, eagles, and kites in that they kill with their beaks instead of their talons.

Nankeen kestrel, Falco cenchroidesAustralian hobby, Falco longipennisBrown falcon, Falco berigoraGray falcon, Falco hypoleucos (A)
Black falcon, Falco subniger 
Peregrine falcon, Falco peregrinusCockatoos
Order: PsittaciformesFamily:  Cacatuidae

The cockatoos share many features with other parrots including the characteristic curved beak shape and a zygodactyl foot, with two forward toes and two backwards toes. They differ, however in a number of characteristics, including the often spectacular movable headcrest.

Red-tailed black-cockatoo, Calyptorhynchus banksii 
Glossy black-cockatoo, Calyptorhynchus lathami 
Yellow-tailed black-cockatoo, Calyptorhynchus funereus 
Gang-gang cockatoo, Callocephalon fimbriatum 
Pink cockatoo, Lophochroa leadbeateri 
Galah, Eolophus roseicapillaLong-billed corella, Cacatua tenuirostrisLittle corella, Cacatua sanguineaSulphur-crested cockatoo, Cacatua galeritaCockatiel, Nymphicus hollandicusOld World parrots
Order: PsittaciformesFamily: Psittaculidae

Characteristic features of parrots include a strong curved bill, an upright stance, strong legs, and clawed zygodactyl feet. Many parrots are vividly coloured, and some are multi-coloured. Old World parrots are found from Africa east across south and southeast Asia and Oceania to Australia and New Zealand.

Superb parrot, Polytelis swainsonii 
Regent parrot, Polytelis anthopeplus 
Princess parrot, Polytelis alexandrae 
Australian king-parrot, Alisterus scapularis 
Ground parrot, Pezoporus wallicus 
Night parrot, Pezoporus occidentalis 
Blue-winged parrot, Neophema chrysostoma 
Elegant parrot, Neophema elegans 
Orange-bellied parrot, Neophema chrysogaster  
Turquoise parrot, Neophema pulchella 
Scarlet-chested parrot, Neophema splendida (A)
Swift parrot, Lathamus discolor 
Australian ringneck, Barnardius barnardiCrimson rosella, Platycercus elegans 
Eastern rosella, Platycercus eximius 
Greater bluebonnet, Northiella haematogasterRed-rumped parrot, Psephotus haematonotus 
Mulga parrot, Psephotus variusBudgerigar, Melopsittacus undulatus 
Little lorikeet, Parvipsitta pusilla 
Purple-crowned lorikeet, Parvipsitta porphyrocephala 
Musk lorikeet, Glossopsitta concinna 
Scaly-breasted lorikeet, Trichoglossus chlorolepidotus (I)
Rainbow lorikeet, Trichoglossus moluccanusRed-collared lorikeet, Trichoglossus rubritorquisLyrebirds
Order: PasseriformesFamily: Menuridae

Lyrebirds are most notable for their superb ability to mimic natural and artificial sounds from their environment, and the striking beauty of the male bird's huge tail when it is fanned out in courtship display.

Superb lyrebird, Menura novaehollandiaeBowerbirds
Order: PasseriformesFamily: Ptilonorhynchidae

The bowerbirds are small to medium-sized passerine birds. The males notably build a bower to attract a mate. Depending on the species, the bower ranges from a circle of cleared earth with a small pile of twigs in the center to a complex and highly decorated structure of sticks and leaves.

Regent bowerbird, Sericulus chrysocephalus 
Satin bowerbird, Ptilonorhynchus violaceus 
Spotted bowerbird, Chlamydera maculata (A)

Australasian treecreepers
Order: PasseriformesFamily: Climacteridae

The Climacteridae are medium-small, mostly brown-coloured birds with patterning on their underparts.

White-throated treecreeper, Cormobates leucophaea 
White-browed treecreeper, Climacteris affinis 
Red-browed treecreeper, Climacteris erythrops 
Brown treecreeper, Climacteris picumnus 

Fairywrens
Order: PasseriformesFamily: Maluridae

Maluridae is a family of small, insectivorous passerine birds endemic to Australia and New Guinea. They are socially monogamous and sexually promiscuous, meaning that although they form pairs between one male and one female, each partner will mate with other individuals and even assist in raising the young from such pairings.

Striated grasswren, Amytornis striatus 
Short-tailed grasswren, Amytornis merrotsyi 
Southern emuwren, Stipiturus malachurus 
Malle emuwren, Stipiturus mallee 
Purple-backed fairywren, Malurus assimilis 
Variegated fairywren, Malurus lamberti 
Splendid fairywren, Malurus splendensSuperb fairywren, Malurus cyaneus 
White-winged fairywren, Malurus leucopterus 

Honeyeaters
Order: PasseriformesFamily: Meliphagidae

The honeyeaters are a large and diverse family of small to medium-sized birds most common in Australia and New Guinea. They are nectar feeders and closely resemble other nectar-feeding passerines.

Eastern spinebill, Acanthorhynchus tenuirostrisPied honeyeater, Certhionyx variegatus (A)
Lewin's honeyeater, Meliphaga lewinii 
White-fronted honeyeater, Purnella albifrons 
Yellow-faced honeyeater, Caligavis chrysops 
Yellow-tufted honeyeater, Lichenostomus melanopsPurple-gaped honeyeater, Lichenostomus cratitius 
Bell miner, Manorina melanophrys 
Noisy miner, Manorina melanocephala 
Yellow-throated miner, Manorina flavigula 
Black-eared miner, Manorina melanotisSpiny-cheeked honeyeater, Acanthagenys rufogularisLittle wattlebird, Anthochaera chrysoptera  
Regent honeyeater, Anthochaera phrygia 
Red wattlebird, Anthochaera carunculata 
Singing honeyeater, Gavicalis virescens 
Yellow-plumed honeyeater, Ptilotula ornataWhite-plumed honeyeater, Ptilotula penicillataFuscous honeyeater, Ptilotula fusca 
Gray-fronted honeyeater, Ptilotula plumula (A)
Crimson chat, Epthianura tricolor 
Orange chat, Epthianura aurifrons  
White-fronted chat, Epthianura albifronsBlack honeyeater, Sugomel nigerScarlet myzomela, Myzomela sanguinolentaTawny-crowned honeyeater, Gliciphila melanopsBrown honeyeater, Lichmera indistincta (A)
Crescent honeyeater, Phylidonyris pyrrhopterusNew Holland honeyeater, Phylidonyris novaehollandiae 
White-cheeked honeyeater, Phylidonyris niger (A)
White-eared honeyeater, Nesoptilotis leucotis 
Blue-faced honeyeater, Entomyzon cyanotisWhite-naped honeyeater, Melithreptus lunatus 
Brown-headed honeyeater, Melithreptus brevirostris 
Black-chinned honeyeater, Melithreptus gularis 
Striped honeyeater, Plectorhyncha lanceolataPainted honeyeater, Grantiella picta 
Little friarbird, Philemon citreogularisNoisy friarbird, Philemon corniculatusBristlebirds
Order: PasseriformesFamily: Dasyornithidae

Bristlebirds are long-tailed, sedentary, ground-frequenting birds. The common name of the family is derived from the presence of prominent rictal bristles - three stiff, hair-like feathers curving downwards on either side of the gape.

Eastern bristlebird, Dasyornis brachypterusRufous bristlebird, Dasyornis broadbentiPardalotes
Order: PasseriformesFamily: Pardalotidae

Pardalotes spend most of their time high in the outer foliage of trees, feeding on insects, spiders, and above all lerps (a type of sap-sucking insect).

Spotted pardalote, Pardalotus punctatus 
Striated pardalote, Pardalotus striatusThornbills and allies
Order: PasseriformesFamily: Acanthizidae

Thornbills are small passerine birds, similar in habits to the tits.

Pilotbird, Pycnoptilus floccosus 
White-browed scrubwren, Sericornis frontalis 
Large-billed scrubwren, Sericornis magnirostra 
Redthroat, Pyrrholaemus brunneus 
Speckled warbler, Pyrrholaemus sagittatus 
Rufous fieldwren, Calamanthus campestris 
Striated fieldwren, Calamanthus fuliginosus 
Chestnut-rumped heathwren, Hylacola pyrrhopygia 
Shy heathwren, Hylacola cautaBuff-rumped thornbill, Acanthiza reguloides 
Slender-billed thornbill, Acanthiza iredalei 
Brown thornbill, Acanthiza pusilla 
Inland thornbill, Acanthiza apicalis 
Yellow-rumped thornbill, Acanthiza chrysorrhoa 
Chestnut-rumped thornbill, Acanthiza uropygialis 
Yellow thornbill, Acanthiza nana 
Striated thornbill, Acanthiza lineata 
Weebill, Smicrornis brevirostris 
White-throated gerygone, Gerygone olivaceaBrown gerygone, Gerygone mouki 
Western gerygone, Gerygone fusca 
Southern whiteface, Aphelocephala leucopsisPseudo-babblers
Order: PasseriformesFamily: Pomatostomidae

The pseudo-babblers are small to medium-sized birds endemic to Australia and New Guinea. They are ground-feeding omnivores and highly social.

Gray-crowned babbler, Pomatostomus temporalisWhite-browed babbler, Pomatostomus superciliosus  
Chestnut-crowned babbler, Pomatostomus ruficepsQuail-thrushes and jewel-babblers
Order: PasseriformesFamily: Cinclosomatidae

The Cinclosomatidae is a family containing jewel-babblers and quail-thrushes.

Spotted quail-thrush, Cinclosoma punctatum 
Chestnut quail-thrush, Cinclosoma castanotum 

Cuckooshrikes
Order: PasseriformesFamily: Campephagidae

The cuckooshrikes are small to medium-sized passerine birds. They are predominantly greyish with white and black, although some species are brightly coloured.

Ground cuckooshrike, Coracina maxima (A)
Black-faced cuckooshrike, Coracina novaehollandiaeWhite-bellied cuckooshrike, Coracina papuensisWhite-winged triller, Lalage tricolorCommon cicadabird,  Edolisoma tenuirostreSittellas
Order: PasseriformesFamily: Neosittidae

The sittellas are a family of small passerine birds found only in Australasia. They resemble treecreepers, but have soft tails.

Varied sittella, Neositta chrysopteraWhipbirds and wedgebills
Order: PasseriformesFamily: Psophodidae

The Psophodidae is a family containing whipbirds and wedgebills.

Eastern whipbird, Psophodes olivaceusWestern whipbird, Psophodes nigrogularisChirruping wedgebill, Psophodes cristatus (A)

Australo-Papuan bellbirds
Order: PasseriformesFamily: Oreoicidae

The three species contained in the family have been moved around between  different families for fifty years. A series of studies of the DNA of Australian birds between 2006 and 2001 found strong support for treating the three genera as a new family, which was formally named in 2016.

Crested bellbird, Oreoica gutturalisShrike-tits
Order: PasseriformesFamily: Falcunculidae

The shrike-tits have a parrot-like bill, used for distinctive bark-stripping behaviour, which gains it access to invertebrates

Eastern shrike-tit, Falcunculus frontatusWhistlers and allies
Order: PasseriformesFamily: Pachycephalidae

The family Pachycephalidae includes the whistlers, shrikethrushes, and some of the pitohuis.

Gray shrikethrush, Colluricincla harmonicaOlive whistler, Pachycephala olivaceaRed-lored whistler, Pachycephala rufogularisGilbert's whistler, Pachycephala inornataGolden whistler, Pachycephala pectoralisWestern whistler, Pachycephala fuliginosaRufous whistler, Pachycephala rufiventrisOld World orioles
Order: PasseriformesFamily: Oriolidae

The Old World orioles are colourful passerine birds. They are not related to the New World orioles.

Olive-backed oriole, Oriolus sagittatusAustralasian figbird, Sphecotheres vieillotiWoodswallows, bellmagpies, and allies
Order: PasseriformesFamily: Artamidae

The woodswallows are soft-plumaged, somber-coloured passerine birds. They are smooth, agile flyers with moderately large, semi-triangular wings. The cracticids: currawongs, bellmagpies and butcherbirds, are similar to the other corvids. They have large, straight bills and mostly black, white or grey plumage. All are omnivorous to some degree.

White-breasted woodswallow, Artamus leucorynchusMasked woodswallow, Artamus personatus 
White-browed woodswallow, Artamus superciliosus 
Black-faced woodswallow, Artamus cinereusDusky woodswallow, Artamus cyanopterusLittle woodswallow, Artamus minor (A)
Gray butcherbird, Cracticus torquatus 
Pied butcherbird, Cracticus nigrogularisAustralian magpie, Gymnorhina tibicenPied currawong, Strepera graculinaGray currawong, Strepera versicolorFantails
Order: PasseriformesFamily: Rhipiduridae

The fantails are small insectivorous birds which are specialist aerial feeders.

Willie-wagtail, Rhipidura leucophrysRufous fantail, Rhipidura rufifronsGray fantail, Rhipidura albiscapaDrongos
Order: PasseriformesFamily: Dicruridae

The drongos are mostly black or dark grey in colour, sometimes with metallic tints. They have long forked tails, and some Asian species have elaborate tail decorations. They have short legs and sit very upright when perched, like a shrike. They flycatch or take prey from the ground.

Spangled drongo, Dicrurus bracteatus (A)

Monarch flycatchers
Order: PasseriformesFamily: Monarchidae

The monarch flycatchers are small to medium-sized insectivorous passerines which hunt by flycatching.

White-eared monarch, Carterornis leucotis (A)
Black-faced monarch, Monarcha melanopsisSpectacled monarch, Symposiachrus trivirgatus (A)
Magpie-lark, Grallina cyanoleucaLeaden flycatcher, Myiagra rubeculaSatin flycatcher, Myiagra cyanoleucaRestless flycatcher, Myiagra inquieta  

White-winged chough and apostlebird
Order: PasseriformesFamily: Corcoracidae

They are found in open habitat in eastern Australia, mostly open eucalypt woodlands and some forest that lacks a closed canopy. They are highly social, spend much of their time foraging through leaf litter with a very distinctive gait, calling to one another almost constantly

White-winged chough, Corcorax melanorhamphos 
Apostlebird, Struthidea cinereaCrows, jays, and magpies
Order: PasseriformesFamily: Corvidae

The family Corvidae includes crows, ravens, jays, choughs, magpies, treepies, nutcrackers and ground jays. Corvids are above average in size among the Passeriformes, and some of the larger species show high levels of intelligence.

House crow, Corvus splendens (A)
Little crow, Corvus bennetti 
Australian raven, Corvus coronoides 
Little raven, Corvus mellori (A)
Forest raven, Corvus tasmanicusAustralasian robins
Order: PasseriformesFamily: Petroicidae

Most species of Petroicidae have a stocky build with a large rounded head, a short straight bill and rounded wingtips. They occupy a wide range of wooded habitats, from subalpine to tropical rainforest, and mangrove swamp to semi-arid scrubland. All are primarily insectivores, although a few supplement their diet with seeds.

Jacky-winter, Microeca fascinansScarlet robin, Petroica multicolorFlame robin, Petroica phoenicea (A)
Rose robin, Petroica rosea 
Pink robin, Petroica rodinogaster 
Red-capped robin, Petroica goodenovii 
Hooded robin, Melanodryas cucullata  
Eastern yellow robin, Eopsaltria australis 
Southern scrub-robin, Drymodes brunneopygia 

Larks
Order: PasseriformesFamily: Alaudidae

Larks are small terrestrial birds with often extravagant songs and display flights. Most larks are fairly dull in appearance. Their food is insects and seeds.

Horsfield’s bushlark, Mirafra javanicaEurasian skylark, Alauda arvensis (I)

Cisticolas and allies
Order: PasseriformesFamily: Cisticolidae

The Cisticolidae are warblers found mainly in warmer southern regions of the Old World. They are generally very small birds of drab brown or grey appearance found in open country such as grassland or scrub.

Golden-headed cisticola, Cisticola exilisReed warblers and allies
Order: PasseriformesFamily: Acrocephalidae

The members of this family are usually rather large for "warblers". Most are rather plain olivaceous brown above with much yellow to beige below. They are usually found in open woodland, reedbeds, or tall grass. The family occurs mostly in southern to western Eurasia and surroundings, but it also ranges far into the Pacific, with some species in Africa.

Australian reed warbler, Acrocephalus australisGrassbirds and allies
Order: PasseriformesFamily: Locustellidae

Locustellidae are a family of small insectivorous songbirds found mainly in Eurasia, Africa, and the Australian region. They are smallish birds with tails that are usually long and pointed, and tend to be drab brownish or buffy all over.

Little grassbird, Poodytes gramineusBrown songlark, Cincloramphus cruralisRufous songlark, Cincloramphus mathewsi 
Tawny grassbird, Cincloramphus timoriensisSwallows
Order: PasseriformesFamily: Hirundinidae

The family Hirundinidae is adapted to aerial feeding. They have a slender streamlined body, long pointed wings, and a short bill with a wide gape. The feet are adapted to perching rather than walking, and the front toes are partially joined at the base.

Welcome swallow, Hirundo neoxenaFairy martin, Petrochelidon ariel 
Tree martin, Petrochelidon nigricansWhite-backed swallow, Cheramoeca leucosternaBulbuls
Order: PasseriformesFamily: Pycnonotidae

Bulbuls are medium-sized songbirds. Some are colourful with yellow, red or orange vents, cheeks, throats or supercilia, but most are drab, with uniform olive-brown to black plumage. Some species have distinct crests.

Red-whiskered bulbul, Pycnonotus jocosus (I)

White-eyes, yuhinas, and allies
Order: PasseriformesFamily: Zosteropidae

The white-eyes are small birds of rather drab appearance, the plumage above being typically greenish-olive, but some species have a white or bright yellow throat, breast, or lower parts, and several have buff flanks. As the name suggests, many species have a white ring around each eye.

Silver-eye, Zosterops lateralisStarlings
Order: PasseriformesFamily: Sturnidae

Starlings are small to medium-sized passerine birds. Their flight is strong and direct and they are very gregarious. Their preferred habitat is fairly open country. They eat insects and fruit. Plumage is typically dark with a metallic sheen.

European starling, Sturnus vulgaris (I)
Common myna, Acridotheres tristis (I)

Thrushes and allies
Order: PasseriformesFamily: Turdidae

The thrushes are a group of passerine birds that occur mainly in the Old World. They are plump, soft plumaged, small to medium-sized insectivores or sometimes omnivores, often feeding on the ground. Many have attractive songs.

Bassian thrush, Zoothera lunulataSong thrush, Turdus philomelos (I)
Eurasian blackbird, Turdus merula (I)

Flowerpeckers
Order: PasseriformesFamily: Dicaeidae

The flowerpeckers are very small, stout, often brightly coloured birds, with short tails, short thick curved bills, and tubular tongues.

Mistletoebird, Dicaeum hirundinaceumWaxbills and allies
Order: PasseriformesFamily: Estrildidae

The estrildid finches are small passerine birds of the Old World tropics and Australasia. They are gregarious and often colonial seed eaters with short thick but pointed bills. They are all similar in structure and habits, but have wide variation in plumage colours and patterns.

Diamond firetail, Stagonopleura guttata 
Beautiful firetail, Stagonopleura bellaRed-browed firetail, Neochmia temporalisPlum-headed finch, Aidemosyne modesta 
Double-barred finch, Stizoptera bichenoviiZebra finch, Taeniopygia guttataChestnut-breasted munia, Lonchura castaneothorax'
Old World sparrows
Order: PasseriformesFamily: Passeridae

Old World sparrows are small passerine birds, typically small, plump, brown or grey with short tails and short powerful beaks. They are seed-eaters, but also consume small insects.

House sparrow, Passer domesticus (I)
Eurasian tree sparrow, Passer montanus (I)

Wagtails and pipits
Order: PasseriformesFamily: Motacillidae

Motacillidae is a family of small passerine birds with medium to long tails and comprises the wagtails, longclaws, and pipits. These are slender ground-feeding insectivores of open country.

Eastern yellow wagtail, Motacilla tschutschensis (A)
White wagtail, Motacilla alba (A)
Australian pipit, Anthus australisFinches, euphonias, and allies
Order: PasseriformesFamily: Fringillidae

Finches are small to moderately large seed-eating passerine birds with a strong beak, usually conical and in some species very large. All have 12 tail feathers and nine primary flight feathers. Finches have a bouncing flight, alternating bouts of flapping with gliding on closed wings, and most sing well.

European greenfinch, Chloris chloris (I)
European goldfinch, Carduelis carduelis'' (I)

See also
List of birds
Lists of birds by region
List of birds of Australia

References

Victoria